Jordyn Burns (born September 29, 1992) is an American professional ice hockey defender currently with the Buffalo Beauts of the National Women's Hockey League. Burns is from Minnesota and played collegiately with Syracuse, transferring to the Minnesota Golden Gophers of the Western Collegiate Hockey Association after her freshman year. Burns participated in the 3rd NWHL All-Star Game.

References

External links 
 
 
 

1992 births
American women's ice hockey defensemen
Buffalo Beauts players
Living people
Minnesota Golden Gophers women's ice hockey players
Syracuse Orange women's ice hockey players